The 1937 Loyola Lions football team was an American football team that represented Loyola University of Los Angeles (now known as Loyola Marymount University) as an independent during the 1937 college football season. In their eighth season under head coach Tom Lieb, the Lions compiled a 4–7 record.

Schedule

References

Loyola
Loyola Lions football seasons
Loyola Lions football